Sugarland is a 1992 EP by Magnapop released in Europe by Play It Again Sam Records on Compact Disc (catalogue number 450.0228.22 - BIAS 228 CD) and 12" gramophone record (450.0228.30 - BIAS 228.) The former two of these tracks are also featured on their debut album Magnapop and the latter two were added on to the 1997 re-release of the album.

Track listing
All songs written by Linda Hopper and Ruthie Morris, except where noted
"Merry" – 3:04
"Garden" – 2:21
"Skinburns" – 4:03
"Snake" (Hopper, Morris, and Shannon Mulvaney) – 5:44

Personnel
Magnapop
Linda Hopper – lead vocals
David McNair – drums
Ruthie Morris – guitar, backing vocals
Shannon Mulvaney – bass guitar

Technical staff
Ed Burdell – engineering (except "Merry")
Magnapop – production
Michael Stipe – production

Sales chart performance
The EP reached the top 20 in the Dutch Top 40.

References

External links

Sugarland at Discogs

1992 EPs
Albums produced by Michael Stipe
Magnapop EPs
PIAS Recordings EPs
1992 debut albums